Clacy-et-Thierret is a commune in the Aisne department, Hauts-de-France, northern France.

Population

See also
Communes of the Aisne department

References

Communes of Aisne
Aisne communes articles needing translation from French Wikipedia